On The Might Of Princes were an American post-hardcore band from Long Island, New York, active during the late 1990s and early 2000s.

History
On The Might Of Princes formed on Long Island, New York in 1998, emerging from an heterogenous but cooperative community of independent bands and labels. First releasing material on Rok Lok (The Making of a Conversation) and Creep Records/Traffic Violation Records Where You Are and Where You Want to Be), they eventually signed to Revelation records and released what would be their third and final record, Sirens, in 2003.

After a follow-up tour of Europe, On The Might Of Princes disbanded in May 2004. After a two-year split, they reunited in late 2006 to play three shows. Soon afterward, expanded re-releases of their first two albums were released on Rok Lok Records in January 2007. In August 2008, they temporarily reunited once again for a few more shows. In 2012, Revelation Records announced that the group would reunite yet again for the label's 25th anniversary festival at Irving Plaza. A fourth reunion was planned for June 2013, but was cancelled for undisclosed reasons. Soon after, the band formally declared that there would be no more shows or new material and they had officially broken up.

Jason Rosenthal passed away in Austin, Texas of a heart attack on August 12, 2013. He was 35.

Band members
 Jason Rosenthal - Guitar, vocals, melodica
 Lou Fontana - Guitar, vocals
 Tom Orza - Bass, vocals
 Chris Enriquez - Drums, percussion, piano

Former members
 Nicole Keiper- Drums on The Making of a Conversation and demo cassette

Current projects
Jason Rosenthal went on to sing and play guitar in The Brass from 2007 to 2010. Vehicles, a project consisting of Rosenthal, Ellis, Rich Buckley (ex-Shapes) and Rob "Wiz" Wisely (ex-Blakfish) was roughly recorded but shelved. Following Rosenthal's death in August 2013, Tom Tierney (Tidal Arms, Julie Christmas) collaborated with the remaining members to complete the material. As of 2015 it remains unreleased. Rosenthal was also involved in a band called Oscenita with his girlfriend, Emily Ruf and collaborated with The Saddest Landscape on a few tracks, some released and some unreleased.

Chris Enriquez is the drummer for Spotlights (Ipecac Recordings) and Primitive Weapons (Party Smasher Inc.) He also played drums in Gracer (Revelation Records) and Haan (Aqualamb Records).  Chris has performed as a live drummer for Criteria (Saddle Creek Records), Shai Hulud, Supertouch (Revelation Records), Beyond, LaPeche, Judas Knife, Clockwise, Inside, Alove for Enemies and many more. Chris Enriquez played drums and wrote songs for band "The Crushlist" who played a show with On The Might of Princes - members included Chris Enriquez on drums, Mike Dibenedetto on bass, Peter Squires on guitar and on vocals - Jade Kuei (artist now known as MUMBOT). He also plays guitar in Total Meltdown.

Tom Orza is the bassist for Aux Era and King Weapon. He also played in Mont Gomery, Villa Vina (with Enriquez), Limbs and Judas Knife. 

Lou Fontana is the singer/guitarist/multi-instrumentalist for God's Gift to Women. He also played guitar in Small Arms Dealer (Deep Elm Records), Fellow Project and Go White Bronco (86'd Records) and bass in the now defunct band, With Every Idle Hour.

Discography
Studio albums
 The Making of a Conversation (Rok Lok Records, released August 1999)
 Where You Are and Where You Want to Be (Creep Records & Traffic Violation Records, released 2001)
 Sirens (Revelation Records, released September 2003)

References

External links
Revelation Records
Rok Lok Records

American post-hardcore musical groups
Musical groups from Long Island
Punk rock groups from New York (state)
Musical groups established in 1998
Musical groups disestablished in 2004